The Pockels effect or Pockels electro-optic effect, also known as the linear electro-optic effect, is named after Friedrich Carl Alwin Pockels who studied the effect in 1893.  The Pockels effect is a directionally dependent linear variation in the refractive index of an optical medium that occurs in response to the application of an electric field.  The Kerr effect is comparable but causes changes in the refractive index at a rate proportional to the square of the applied electric field.  In optical media susceptible to the Pockels effect, the Pockels effect causes changes in birefringence that vary in proportion to the strength of the applied electric field.  The Pockels effect occurs in crystals that lack inversion symmetry, such as KH2PO4 (KDP), KD2PO4 (KD*P or DKDP), lithium niobate (LiNbO3), and in other non-centrosymmetric media such as electric-field poled polymers or glasses. The Pockels effect has been elucidated through extensive study of electro-optic properties in materials like KDP.

Pockels cells
Pockels cells are voltage-controlled wave plates. The Pockels effect is the basis of the operation of Pockels cells. Pockels cells may be used to rotate the polarization of a beam that passes through. See applications below for uses.

A transverse Pockels cell consists of two crystals in opposite orientation, which together give a zero-order wave plate when the voltage is turned off. This is often not perfect and drifts with temperature. But the mechanical alignment of the crystal axis is not so critical and is often done by hand without screws; while misalignment leads to some energy in the wrong ray (either e or ofor example, horizontal or vertical), in contrast to the longitudinal case, the loss is not amplified through the length of the crystal.

The electric field can be applied to the crystal medium either longitudinally or transversely to the light beam. Longitudinal Pockels cells need transparent or ring electrodes. Transverse voltage requirements can be reduced by lengthening the crystal.

Alignment of the crystal axis with the ray axis is critical. Misalignment leads to birefringence and to a large phase shift across the long crystal. This leads to polarization rotation if the alignment is not exactly parallel or perpendicular to the polarization.

Dynamics within the cell 
Because of the high relative dielectric constant of εr ≈ 36 inside the crystal, changes in the electric field propagate at a speed of only c/6. Fast non-fiber optic cells are thus embedded into a matched transmission line. Putting it at the end of a transmission line leads to reflections and doubled switching time. The signal from the driver is split into parallel lines that lead to both ends of the crystal. When they meet in the crystal, their voltages add up.
Pockels cells for fiber optics may employ a traveling wave design to reduce current requirements and increase speed.

Usable crystals also exhibit the piezoelectric effect to some degree (RTP has the lowest, BBO and lithium niobate are high). After a voltage change, sound waves start propagating from the sides of the crystal to the middle. This is important not for pulse pickers, but for boxcar windows. Guard space between the light and the faces of the crystals needs to be larger for longer holding times.
Behind the sound wave the crystal stays deformed in the equilibrium position for the high electric field.
This increases the polarization. Due to the growing of the polarized volume the electric field in the crystal in front of the wave increases
linearly, or the driver has to provide a constant current leakage.

The driver electronics 
The driver must withstand the doubled voltage returned to it.  Pockels cells behave like a capacitor. When switching these to high voltage, a high charge is needed; consequently, 3 ns switching requires about 40 A for a 5 mm aperture.
Shorter cables reduce the amount of charge wasted in transporting current to the cell.

The driver may employ many transistors connected parallel and serial.
The transistors are floating and need DC isolation for their gates.
To do this, the gate signal is connected via optical fiber, or the gates are driven by a large transformer.
In this case, careful compensation for feedback is needed to prevent oscillation.

The driver may employ a cascade of transistors and a triode.
In a classic, commercial circuit the last transistor is an IRF830 MOSFET and the triode is an Eimac Y690 triode.
The setup with a single triode has the lowest capacity; this even justifies turning off the cell by applying the double voltage.
A resistor ensures the leakage current needed by the crystal and later to recharge the storage capacitor.
The Y690 switches up to 10 kV and the cathode delivers 40 A if the grid is on +400 V.
In this case the grid current is 8 A and the input impedance is thus 50 ohms, which matches standard coaxial cables, and the MOSFET can thus be placed remotely. Some of the 50 ohms are spent on an additional resistor which pulls the bias on −100 V.
The IRF can switch 500 volts. It can deliver 18 A pulsed.
Its leads function as an inductance, a storage capacitor is employed, the 50 ohm coax cable is connected, the MOSFET has an internal resistance,
and in the end this is a critically damped RLC circuit, which is fired by a pulse to the gate of the MOSFET.

The gate needs 5 V pulses (range: ±20 V) while provided with 22 nC.
Thus the current gain of this transistor is one for 3 ns switching, but it still has voltage gain.
Thus it could theoretically also be used in common gate configuration and not in common source configuration.
Transistors, which switch 40 V are typically faster, so in the previous stage a current gain is possible.

Applications
Pockels cells are used in a variety of scientific and technical applications. A Pockels cell, combined with a polarizer, can be used for switching between no optical rotation and 90° rotation, creating a fast shutter capable of "opening" and "closing" in nanoseconds. The same technique can be used to impress information on the beam by modulating the rotation between 0° and 90°; the exiting beam's intensity, when viewed through the polarizer, contains an amplitude-modulated signal. This modulated signal can be used for time-resolved electric field measurements when a crystal is exposed to an unknown electric field.

Pockels cells are used as a Q-switch to generate short, high-intensity laser pulse. The Pockels cell prevents optical amplification by introducing a polarization dependent loss in the laser cavity. This allows the gain medium to have a high population inversion. When the gain medium has the desired population inversion, the Pockels cell is switched "open", and a short high energy laser pulse is created. 

Pockels cells are also used in regenerative amplifiers, chirped pulse amplification, and cavity dumping to let optical power in and out of lasers and optical amplifiers.

Pockels cells can be used for quantum key distribution by polarizing photons.

Pockels cells in conjunction with other EO elements can be combined to form electro-optic probes.

A Pockels cell was used by MCA Disco-Vision (DiscoVision) engineers in the optical videodisc mastering system. Light from an argon-ion laser was passed through the Pockels cell to create pulse modulations corresponding to the original FM video and audio signals to be recorded on the master videodisc. MCA used the Pockels cell in videodisc mastering until the sale to Pioneer Electronics. To increase the quality of the recordings, MCA patented a Pockels cell stabilizer that reduced the second-harmonic distortion that could be created by the Pockels cell during mastering. MCA used either a DRAW (Direct Read After Write) mastering system or a photoresist system. The DRAW system was originally preferred, since it didn't require clean-room conditions during disc recording and allowed instant quality checking during mastering. The original single-sided test pressings from 1976/77 were mastered with the DRAW system as were the "educational", non-feature titles at the format's release in December 1978.

Pockels cells are used in two-photon microscopy.

See also
 Electro-optic modulator
 Acousto-optic modulator
 Kerr effect

References 

Nonlinear optics
Polarization (waves)
Quantum information science